USS Kuwana II (SP-594) was a United States Navy patrol vessel in commission from 1917 to 1918.

Kuwana II was built as a private motorboat of the same name by the Electric Launch Company (Elco) at Bayonne, New Jersey, in 1911. In 1917, the U.S. Navy leased her from her owner, Frank E. Masland of Philadelphia, Pennsylvania, for use as a section patrol boat during World War I. The Navy took delivery of her on 2 June 1917 and she was commissioned the same day as USS Kumara II (SP-594). She was enrolled in the Naval Coast Defense Reserve on 8 June 1917.

Assigned to the 4th Naval District, Kuwana II was based at Cold Spring Harbor, New Jersey. For the rest of World War I, she patrolled the Delaware Bay and Delaware River from Cape May, New Jersey, to Wilmington, Delaware, guarded the submarine net at Fort Delaware, and patrolled coastal waters near her base. She also served as a dispatch boat and training ship.

Kuwana II was stricken from the Navy List on 5 December 1918 and returned to Masland.

Notes

References

SP-594: Kuwana II at Department of the Navy Naval History and Heritage Command Online Library of Selected Images: U.S. Navy Ships -- Listed by Hull Number: "SP" #s and "ID" #s -- World War I Era Patrol Vessels and other Acquired Ships and Craft numbered from SP-500 through SP-599
NavSource Online: Section Patrol Craft Photo Archive Kuwana II (SP 594)

Patrol vessels of the United States Navy
World War I patrol vessels of the United States
Ships built in Bayonne, New Jersey
1911 ships